The U.S. Post Office in Port Jervis, New York serves the 12771 ZIP Code. This covers all of the city of Port Jervis and adjoining portions of the Town of Deer Park. It is located downtown, at 20 Sussex St.

The building was designed by Oscar Wenderoth in the early 1920s in a Colonial Revival style of brick and mortar. It was added to the National Register of Historic Places in 1989. In 2007 the United States Congress enacted legislation introduced by Rep. John Hall to rename the building the E. Arthur Gray Post Office Building, after E. Arthur Gray, mayor of Port Jervis from 1978–88.

See also

References
Notes

External links

Port Jervis, New York
Buildings and structures in Orange County, New York
National Register of Historic Places in Orange County, New York
Port Jervis, New York